Ernobiinae is a subfamily of death-watch and spider beetles in the family Ptinidae. There are about 8 genera and at least 90 described species in Ernobiinae.

The subfamily Dryophilinae, along with Anobiinae and several others, were formerly considered members of the family Anobiidae, but the family name has since been changed to Ptinidae.

Genera
These 10 genera belong to the subfamily Ernobiinae:
 Episernomorphus Roubal, 1917 g
 Episernus Thomson, 1863 i c g b
 Ernobius Thomson, 1859 i c g b
 Microzogus Fall, 1905 i c g b
 Ochina Sturm, 1826 g
 Ozognathus LeConte, 1861 i c g b
 Paralobium Fall, 1905-01 i c g
 Utobium Fall, 1905 i c g b
 Xarifa Fall, 1905-01 i c g
 Xestobium Motschulsky, 1845 i c g b
Data sources: i = ITIS, c = Catalogue of Life, g = GBIF, b = Bugguide.net

References

Further reading

 
 
 
 

Bostrichoidea